Uttarkashi, meaning Kashi of the north, is a town located in Uttarkashi district in Uttarakhand, India. Uttarkashi town is headquarters of the district. Uttarkashi is also known as Somya Kashi. Uttarkashi is a religious place for spiritual and adventurous tourism.  Uttarkashi town is also called as Shivnagri. The town has number of temples and ashrams. Uttarkashi is known for its religious people, weather, education.

It is the district headquarters of Uttarkashi district. Uttarkashi is situated on the banks of river Bhagirathi at an altitude of 1158 m above sea level. Uttarkashi is generally known as a holy town close to Rishikesh. It is located in the state of Uttarakhand in India. Uttarkashi is home to a number of ashrams and temples and also to the Nehru Institute of Mountaineering. The name of the town reflects its similarity to and location (as north of) the city of Kashi (Varanasi).

Geography

It has an average elevation of 1,165 metres (4,436 feet).
Most of the terrain is hilly.
There are many small and big rivers in Uttarkashi district. The Yamuna and the Ganges (Bhagirathi) are biggest and holiest among them. The Yamuna originates from Yamunotri while Bhagirathi originates from Gangotri (Gomukh).
Asi ganga and Jad ganga are some of the tributaries of the Ganges.

Demographics

 India census, Uttarkashi city had a population of 40,220. Males constitute 57% of the population and females 43%. Uttarkashi has an average literacy rate of 78%, higher than the national average of 59.5%. Male literacy is 83%, and female literacy is 71%. In Uttarkashi, 11% of the population is under 6 years of age. Most citizens of Uttarkashi are Garhwali, with large numbers of Punjabi, Kumaoni and people from other parts of Northern India. It also has a significant population of the Bhotiya Jadh people.

People of Uttarkashi speak Hindi, Garhwali and Mahasu Pahari.

After Varunawat Landslide in 2003, the rate of increase in population of the town was affected due to the migration of people to other towns and cities. As the time passed, the town boomed with the development and population growth.
But the town was again severely affected by the disastrous floods in 2012 and 2013. This made most of the people to shift to the safer places like Dehradun, Haridwar and Rishikesh.

Tourism

Yoga

Since ancient times, Uttarkashi has been a meditational ground for many sages.  This has been mentioned in Skanda Purana that many sages have found solace here. Due to its serene and perfect location along the holy Ganges, Uttarkashi has always been the first choice for Yoga. Netala, a small scenic heaven around 7 km towards the source of Holy Ganga (i.e., Gangotri Dham) is an emerging spot for Yoga Classes.

List of Yoga Schools

 Yoga Bhawna Mission (Yoga Teacher Training School, affiliated with Yoga Alliance USA) is situated at New Gangotri Bypass road, chungi Badethi.

Lakes of Uttarkashi

 Sat (7) Taal or Sattal : Near in Harsil Uttarkashi
 (I) Chatgiya Taal
 (II) Dabriya Taal
 (III) Mradunga Taal
 (IV) Shri Kantha Taal
 (V) Rikh Taal
 (VI) Gupta Taal
 (VII) Brahmin/Brahman Taal
 Dodi Taal/Ganesh Taal
 Nachiketa Taal
 Kana Taal
 Fachkundi Bayan Taal
 Kedar Taal/Achrao Taal
 Bhransar Taal
 Ruinsara/Rohisada Taal
 Khida Taal
 Lama Taal
 Kyorkot Taal
 Jalandh Taal
 Dev Taal
 Baradsar Taal
 Kansara
 Marinda Taal
 Saru/Bamsaru Taal
 Bamala Taal
 Barmi Taal
 Mangalchu Taal
 Rokai Taal

Trekking
Uttarkashi is also known as a trekking hub as it is gateway to unexplored trekking destinations. Some of the area's summer and winter trekking destinations are Dodital, Dayara Bugyal, Kedarkantha, Har Ki Dun for camping and grandeur Himalayan panoramic views.

  Dodital: One of the popular fresh water lake in Uttarkashi. 21 km trek to Dodital starts from Sangamchatti also known as the birthplace of Lord Ganesha.
  Dayara Bugyal: Situated on 11,975.07 ft height, this meadow is known for its grazing pastures and aromatic wildflowers. Gujjar, the tribal population reside here for 6 month with their livestock. The place is ideal for trekking, hiking and camping in the lap of Himalaya, during winters this meadow also attract skiing lovers. Dayara was also cited as Track of The Year 2015 by State Govt of Uttarakhand. In June 2011, Department of science & Technology, DST with the Science communicator fellow Mr. Sanjay Kumar, P.G. College Uttarkashi have organized Hareet Pathshala (Green Classes) for the benefit of gujjar population reside with their families. Dayara is also famous for annual Butter Festival (Anduri Festival) organized by Angha Mountain organization and Hotel Association of Uttarkashi in month of August.
  Kedarkantha
  Har Ki Dun

Hill Stations

  Harsil
  Chaurangi Khal
  Sankri
  Nelong Valley : Nelong valley is an inner line area (India – China border)

Places of interest

 Established in the year 1965, Nehru Institute of Mountaineering (NIM) is one of the premier mountaineering institutes in India. It conducts courses in Basic Mountaineering (BMC), Advance Mountaineering (AMC), Method of Instruction (MOI) and Mountain Search & Rescue (S&R) besides organizing climbing expeditions. Bachendri Pal, India's first woman to climb Mount Everest, is an alumnus of NIM.
  Nanda Devi Adventure  and Outdoor Education Institute (NDI) is the first private mountaineering institute certified by the Nehru Institute of Mountaineering to conduct courses in Basic Mountaineering, Rock Climbing and Search & Rescue and by the Disaster Mitigation and Management Center (DMMC) of the Govt of Uttarakhand. NDI is located at village Kuflon, 11 kilometers upstream of Uttarkashi on the Sangamchatti road. NDI has another campus at village Lata on the periphery of Nanda Devi in the border district of Chamoli, where it is involved in the development and promotion of outdoor environmental education centric interpretative nature trail to Nanda Devi National Park 
Jamshedpur based Tata Steel Adventure Foundation (TSAF) runs its Himalayan outbound training programs from its Uttarkashi base camp located at Kuflon in the Assiganga Valley in Uttarkashi. TASF is an outbound leadership institute which through its wide range of activities aims at developing able leaders for the future through identification of their limits of mental and physical endurance. It allows people from all walks of life and all ages to choose their own metaphor for self-discovery. TASF is an experiential training institute among the corporate
   Kashi Vishwanath Temple
   Kandar Devta Mandir
   Ganga Kinare (bank of the Ganges)
   Ujeli (constellation of sages): Ujeli is a neighborhood on the north of the town, where many ashrams are located.
   Tiloth Power Plant: Located in Tiloth village at the fringe of Uttarkashi town; Stage 1 of Maneri Bhali hydroelectric project
   Maneri Dam: Located at Maneri (15 km from Uttarkashi town); Stage 1 of Maneri Bhali hydroelectric project
   Bhali Dam: Located in Joshiyara village at the lower fringe of the town. Stage 2 of Maneri Bhali hydroelectric project
   Kuteti Devi temple: Located on a small hill across Bhagirathi River
   Gyansu and Palla Gyansu: Old suburbs of Uttarkashi town, located en route to New Tehri
   Joshiyara: A village across Bhagirathi River. Now becoming a neighborhood. It has a temple, Kaleshwar Mandir, dedicated to Lord Shiva.
   Matli: A battalion of Indo-Tibetan Border Police is located here
   Mahidanda: Another battalion of Indo-Tibetan Border Police is located here

Education

This town has many schools for boys and girls and one Post Graduate college affiliated to Garhwal University. The Government Polytechnic Uttarkashi, situated in Joshiyara around 3–4 km away from main city, provides higher education in technology.

Below is a list of schools in Uttarkashi:

 Him Christian Academy (H.C.A) is a convent school affiliated to the I.C.S.E Board situated at Matli.
 
 Masseeh Dilasa School (M.D.S) is a convent school affiliated to the I.C.S.E Board situated at Tiloth.
 
 Kendriya Vidhyalaya (K.V) Uttarkashi is a higher senior secondary school affiliated to the C.B.S.E situated at Manera.
 
 Maharashi Vidhya Mandir (M.V.M) is a higher senior secondary school affiliated to the C.B.S.E situated at Gyansu.
 
 Rishiram Shikshan Sansthan (R.R.S.S) is a higher senior secondary school affiliated to the C.B.S.E situated at Manera.
 
 Bhagirathi Children Academy (B.C.A) affiliated to the C.B.S.E is situated at Court Road.
 
 Alpine Public school (A.P.S) affiliated to the CBSE Board is situated at Barahat.
 
 A.S.S.S is affiliated to the C.B.S.E Board situated at N.I.M Road.
 
 Gopal Vidya Mandir (G.V.M) is affiliated to the C.B.S.E Board situated at N.I.M Road.
 
 Goswami Ganesh Dutt Saraswati Vidhya Mandir Intermediate College (G.G.D.S.V.M.I.C) is affiliated to the Uttarakhand Board situated at Court Road and is known for giving toppers in Uttarakhand Board merit list.
 
 Adhya Shankaracharya Shikshan Sansthan Intermediate College (A.S.S.S.D.D.L.T.I.C) is affiliated to the Uttarakhand Board situated at N.I.M Road and is known for giving toppers in Uttarakhand Board merit list.
 
 A.S.S.S is affiliated to the Uttarakhand Board situated at N.I.M Road Joshiyara.
 
 B.N.K.B.A.S.S.S.I.C is affiliated to the Uttarakhand Board situated at KotBungalow.
 
 Gandhi School is affiliated to the Uttarakhand Board situated at Court Road
 
 Government Girls Inter College (G.G.I.C) is affiliated to the Uttarakhand Board situated at Court Road.
 
 Government kirti Inter College (G.I.C) for Boys is affiliated to the Uttarakhand Board situated at Court Road.
 
 Rajiv Mahasay Saraswati Shishu Mandir (R.M.S.S.M) affiliated to Uttarakhand Board situated at Tiloth.
 
 Saraswati Vidhya Mandir Intermediate College (S.V.M.I.C) is affiliated to the Uttarakhand Board situated at Jyothipuram Tiloth.
 
 Saraswati Vidhya Mandir Intermediate College (S.V.M.I.C) is affiliated to the Uttarakhand Board situated at Laksheshwar.
 
 Saraswati Shishu Mandir (S.S.M) is situated at Tiloth.
 
 Saraswati Shishu Mandir (S.S.M) situated at Joshiyara.
 
 Saraswati Shishu Mandir (S.S.M) situated at Gyansu. 

 Azim Premji School at Matli. The school is affiliated to Uttarakhand State Board and committed to provide quality education for the students of all sections of community.

See also
1991 Uttarkashi earthquake

References

External links
Things That Will Definitely Make You to Visit Uttarkashi
Uttarakhand Government Portal, Official website
Uttarkashi at Uttaranchal Tourism website
Uttarkashi Tourism 
Resort in Uttarkashi

 
Cities and towns in Uttarkashi district